Frasers Property Australia is a diversified property group with activities across Australia covering the development of residential land, housing and apartments, commercial, retail and property management. Frasers Property Australia (Frasers Property Australia Pty Limited) is the Australian division of Frasers Property, a Singaporean multinational real estate and property management company listed on the Main Board of the Singapore Exchange Securities Trading Limited (SGX-ST).

History
The origins of the company date back to the 1920s, when it was established with the incorporation of TM Burke Pty Ltd. In the 1960s, TM Burke merged with Land and Housing Division of the Hooker Corporation. In 1990, the company began trading under the Australian Housing and Land name, also known as Australand. In 1997, Australand was listed on the Australian Stock Exchange and the Singapore Stock Exchange. 2000 saw the company acquire the Walker Corporation, with FCL beginning its first development in Australia – the Pavilions on the Bay at Glebe Point. Between 2001 and 2002, the Australand Wholesale Property Trusts were established and in the following year, the Australand Property Trust was renamed Australand Property Group. In 2011, Australand was included in A-REIT index while delisted from the SGX-ST. In 2014, Australand was acquired by Frasers Centrepoint Limited and privatised in October of that year. The same year, FCL formerly the property arm of the Fraser & Neave group, was listed on the SGX-ST. In July 2015, Rod Fehring was appointed as the CEO and Australand adopted the Global Frasers Property Brand in August. In October 2015 Frasers Property Australia launched a retail business unit. In 2016, Frasers Logistics & Industrial Trust were listed on SGX-ST and they also launched the sustainability strategy called "A Different Way". In 2017, the CEO Rod Fehring was appointed as the Chairman of Green Building Council of Australia. In 2018, Fraser Centrepoint Limited was renamed Fraser Property Limited. In October 2020, Anthony Boyd was appointed as the new CEO. Frasers Property expanded across the Asia Pacific region, with locations in New Zealand and Singapore, as well as other Australian states.

One Central Park, Sydney

One development of the company is the One Central Park skyscraper, a mixed used urban renewal project located in Chippendale. The skyscraper was awarded a 5 star Green Star – ‘Multi-Unit Residential Design v1’ Certified Rating by the Green Building Council of Australia in 2013, making it the largest multi-residential building (by nett lettable area) in Australia to receive such a designation. In 2014, it was awarded the CTBUH Skyscraper Award, of the Best Tall Building Worldwide from the Council for Tall Buildings and Urban Habitat.

References

Companies based in Sydney
Companies formerly listed on the Australian Securities Exchange 
Companies listed on the Singapore Exchange